is a former Japanese football player.

Playing career
Nakayoshi was born in Tokyo on September 4, 1972. After graduating from Komazawa University, he joined Japan Football League (JFL) club Toshiba (later Consadole Sapporo) in 1995. He played many matches and the club won the champions in 1997 and was promoted to J1 League from 1998. However he moved to JFL club Oita Trinity end of 1997 season without playing J1. The club was promoted to new league J2 League from 1999. However he could hardly play in the match and retired end of 1999 season.

Club statistics

References

External links

1972 births
Living people
Komazawa University alumni
Association football people from Tokyo
Japanese footballers
J2 League players
Japan Football League (1992–1998) players
Hokkaido Consadole Sapporo players
Oita Trinita players
Association football defenders